Mosapramine (Cremin) is an atypical antipsychotic used in Japan for the treatment of schizophrenia. It is a potent dopamine antagonist with high affinity to the D2, D3, and D4 receptors, and with moderate affinity for the 5-HT2 receptors.

See also 
 Carpipramine
 Clocapramine
 Fluspirilene (typical antipsychotic)
 Imidazopyridine

References 

Atypical antipsychotics
Dibenzazepines
Lactams
Chloroarenes
Piperidines
Pyrrolidones
Spiro compounds